This is a list of current and former anime broadcast by Tokyo MX.

#
 86

A
 To the Abandoned Sacred Beasts
 Astra Lost in Space
 Ai Tenchi Muyo!
 Aldnoah.Zero
 Arifureta: From Commonplace to World's Strongest

B
 BanG Dream!
 Beyblade Burst Surge
 Blood Lad
 Bocchi the Rock!
 B-Project
 Blend-S

C
 A Certain Magical Index
 Charlotte
 Cross Ange

D
 Dance with Devils
 Darling in the Franxx
 Darwin's Game
 Date A Live
 Do You Love Your Mom and Her Two-Hit Multi-Target Attacks?
 Don't Toy with Me, Miss Nagatoro
 Dororo
 Dragon Goes House-Hunting
 Dragon Pilot: Hisone and Masotan
 Drifters

E
 Encouragement of Climb
 Ensemble Stars!

F
 Fairy Gone
 Farewell, My Dear Cramer
 Fate/Extra Last Encore

G
 Gargantia on the Verdurous Planet
 gdgd Fairies
 Girls und Panzer
 Godzilla Singular Point

H
 Hanasaku Iroha
 How Heavy Are the Dumbbells You Lift?
 High School Fleet
 Higehiro: After Being Rejected, I Shaved and Took in a High School Runaway

I
 Is It Wrong to Try to Pick Up Girls in a Dungeon?
 Isekai Cheat Magician
 Isekai Quartet

J
 JoJo's Bizarre Adventure
 Junji Ito Collection

K
 Kantai Collection
 Karakuri Circus
 Kawaikereba Hentai demo Suki ni Natte Kuremasuka?
 Keijo
 Kimi to Fit Boxing
 Kirby: Right Back at Ya!
 Kono Oto Tomare! Sounds of Life

L
 Last Hope
 Lord of Vermilion: The Crimson King
 Lost Song
 Love Live! School Idol Project

M
 Maō-sama, Retry!
 Megalobox 2: Nomad
 Midnight Occult Civil Servants
 Moriarty the Patriot

N
 Nagi-Asu: A Lull in the Sea
 Natsunagu!
 Noragami

O
 Ongaku Shōjo
 Onimai: I'm Now Your Sister!
 Oreimo

P
 Pac-Man and the Ghostly Adventures
 Phantom in the Twilight
 A Place Further than the Universe
 Plastic Memories
 Princess Principal

R
 Rascal Does Not Dream of Bunny Girl Senpai
 Re:Creators
 Release the Spyce
 RobiHachi
 RWBY: Ice Queendom

S
 Sailor Moon Crystal
 Strike Witches
 School Babysitters
 Sewayaki Kitsune no Senko-san
 Seven Knights Revolution: Hero Successor
 Shadows House
 Shirobako
 Sirius the Jaeger
 Steins;Gate 0
 Space Dandy
 Spiritpact
 SSSS.Dynazenon
 SSSS.Gridman
 Star-Myu
 Strike Witches: 501st Joint Fighter Wing Take Off!
 Superbook (2011 reboot)
 Steins;Gate
Sora No Method

T
 Tada Never Falls in Love
 Tamako Market
 Teasing Master Takagi-san
 That Time I Got Reincarnated as a Slime
 Thunderbolt Fantasy
 Tiger & Bunny
 Tsuki ga Kirei

V
 Vivy: Fluorite Eye's Song

W
 We Never Learn
 Wise Man's Grandchild

Y
 Yatogame-chan Kansatsu Nikki

Z
 Zombie Land Saga

Tokyo MX
Tokyo MX
Tokyo MX original programming